Charles R. Leedham-Green is a retired professor of mathematics at Queen Mary, University of London, known for his work in group theory. He completed his DPhil at the University of Oxford.

His parents were John Charles Leedham-Green (1902–1984), a surgeon and general practitioner in Southwold, and Gertrude Mary Somerville Caldwell.

Work
With Leonard Soicher, Leedham-Green designed the product replacement algorithm; an algorithm within computational group theory that generates random elements of groups by taking a random walk through the group. This algorithm has been implemented in both GAP and MAGMA.

He is responsible for a great body of work in group theory. In recent times, this has involved research in computational group theory and pro-p groups.

The 300th edition of the Journal of Algebra was dedicated to him for his 65th birthday.
On the occasion of his retirement in 2006, the Mathematics Research Centre at Queen Mary held a conference in celebration of his mathematical achievements.

Selected publications
Charles R. Leedham-Green, Leonard H. Soicher: Collection from the Left and Other Strategies. J. Symb. Comput. 9(5/6): 665–675 (1990)
Charles R. Leedham-Green, Cheryl E. Praeger, Leonard H. Soicher: Computing with Group Homomorphisms. J. Symb. Comput. 12(4/5): 527–532 (1991)
Derek F. Holt, C. R. Leedham-Green, E. A. O'Brien and Sarah Rees: Testing Matrix Groups for Primitivity. Journal of Algebra, Volume 184, Issue 3, 15 September 1996, Pages 795–817
Derek F. Holt, C. R. Leedham-Green, E. A. O'Brien and Sarah Rees: Computing Matrix Group Decompositions with Respect to a Normal Subgroup. Journal of Algebra, Volume 184, Issue 3, 15 September 1996, Pages 818–838.
C. R. Leedham-Green and E. A. O'Brien: Tensor Products are Projective Geometries. Journal of Algebra, Volume 189, Issue 2, 15 March 1997, Pages 514–528
Robert Beals, Charles R. Leedham-Green, Alice C. Niemeyer, Cheryl E. Praeger, Ákos Seress: Permutations With Restricted Cycle Structure And An Algorithmic Application. Combinatorics, Probability & Computing 11(5): (2002)
C. R. Leedham-Green and E. A. O'Brien: Recognising tensor-induced matrix groups. Journal of Algebra, Volume 253, Issue 1, 1 July 2002, Pages 14–30
Nigel Boston and Charles Leedham-Green: Explicit computation of Galois p-groups unramified at p. Journal of Algebra, Volume 256, Issue 2, 15 October 2002, Pages 402–413.
Charles Leedham-Green and Sue McKay: The Structure of Groups of Prime Power Order (2002)
John J. Cannon, Bettina Eick, Charles R. Leedham-Green: Special polycyclic generating sequences for finite soluble groups. J. Symb. Comput. 38(5): 1445–1460 (2004)
Robert Beals, Charles R. Leedham-Green, Alice C. Niemeyer, Cheryl E. Praeger and Ákos Seress: Constructive recognition of finite alternating and symmetric groups acting as matrix groups on their natural permutation modules. Journal of Algebra, Volume 292, Issue 1, 1 October 2005, Pages 4–46
S.P. Glasby, C.R. Leedham-Green and E.A. O'Brien: Writing projective representations over subfields. Journal of Algebra, Volume 295, Issue 1, 1 January 2006, Pages 51–61
Isaac Newton, C. R. Leedham-Green (Editor): "The Mathematical Principles of Natural Philosophy: An Annotated Translation of the Principia" (30 September 2019)

References

External links
His homepage

Year of birth missing (living people)
Living people
Group theorists
20th-century British mathematicians
21st-century British mathematicians
Place of birth missing (living people)
Academics of Queen Mary University of London
People from the Scottish Borders